Anthracobune ("coal mound") is an extinct genus of stem perissodactyl from the middle Eocene of the Upper Kuldana Formation of Kohat, Punjab, Pakistan.

The size of a small tapir, it lived in a marshy environment and fed on soft aquatic plants. It is the largest known anthracobunid. This group was formerly classified with proboscideans.

Notes

References

 
 
 
 

Prehistoric odd-toed ungulates
Eocene odd-toed ungulates
Paleogene mammals of Asia
Prehistoric placental genera
Fossil taxa described in 1940